Angela Joyce "Big Ang" Raiola (June 30, 1960 – February 18, 2016) was an American reality television personality. She was the niece of Salvatore "Sally Dogs" Lombardi (1941–2009), a caporegime ("capo") and drug dealer in the Genovese crime family. Raiola dated gangsters and lived an opulent lifestyle.

Raiola starred in the VH1 reality television series Mob Wives from its second to sixth and final season in 2016. She was featured in her own spin-off series Big Ang in 2012 and Miami Monkey in 2013. At age 55, Raiola died from complications of lung cancer and pneumonia on February 18, 2016.

Life and career

2001 arrest
In May 2001, Raiola was one of fifteen defendants indicted—and later convicted—for their roles in the narcotics operation, which distributed crack cocaine, powdered cocaine, and marijuana in Brooklyn and Manhattan. Federal agents described Raiola as an associate of the drug ring's leader, who was sentenced to nearly thirteen years in prison. She was provided cocaine for "street level distribution," according to an affidavit sworn by a DEA agent and an NYPD detective. Raiola sold the drug from Brooklyn bars where she worked. The case against Raiola and her codefendants was built with the aid of wiretapped conversations, the work of an undercover NYPD detective posing as a drug trafficker, and a confidential informant (CI) who made cocaine buys at the direction of federal agents. Some targets of the federal investigation were low-level associates of the Colombo crime family. Raiola was indicted in May 2001 on six felony counts. Along with a conspiracy-to-distribute charge, she was hit with five counts related to separate cocaine sales she made to the CI. At the time of her arrest, Raiola's handbag contained fourteen small plastic bags containing cocaine.

In March 2003, nearly two years after her arrest, Raiola—who was free on $100,000 bond—pleaded guilty to the indictment's top count. In October 2003, she was sentenced to three years' probation and ordered to spend four months under home confinement. Nine months later, in July 2004, a federal judge issued an order modifying Raiola's probation conditions. She was directed by Judge Sterling Johnson Jr. to enroll in "an outpatient and/or inpatient drug treatment or detoxification program." Court records do not indicate what prompted this order. Of the fifteen defendants indicted in the drug case, nine were sentenced to probation. The other six received prison terms ranging from 33 to 151 months.

The Drunken Monkey
In 2007, Raiola opened a Staten Island bar, The Drunken Monkey, with her cousin SallyAnn Lombardi who held the license, but the bar was forced to shut down in 2015 due to Raiola's past as a convicted felon.

Reality television
In 2011, Raiola was filmed in what would become her break into reality television, Mob Wives. She made her debut as a regular cast member in the show's second season, which premiered January 1, 2012. Raiola would remain as a series regular for the remaining duration of the show's run, and while she filmed one reunion episode on February 13, she was on set for only two hours due to her illness.

Personal life
Raiola had two children, Raquel and Anthony (AJ) Donofrio. She married Neil Murphy in 2009.

Death
Raiola died at the age of 55 on February 18, 2016, due to complications from lung cancer.

Filmography

Bibliography
 Bigger Is Better: Real Life Wisdom from the No-Drama Mama;  (2012)

References

External links

Angela Raiola on Find A Grave

1960 births
2016 deaths
People from Brooklyn
21st-century American actresses
Actresses from New York City
American people of Italian descent
Businesspeople from New York City
Genovese crime family
American people convicted of drug offenses
Deaths from pneumonia in New York (state)
Deaths from lung cancer in New York (state)
Participants in American reality television series
Television personalities from New York City
American women television personalities